A2A is an Italian company.

A2A may also refer to:
 The Algonquin to Adirondacks Collaborative (A2A)
 The adenosine A2A receptor
 The UK Access to Archives (A2A) programme, see The National Archives (United Kingdom)#"Access to Archives"
 The A2A radio transmission mode, see Types of radio emissions#Low-speed data
 A2A Simulations, a flight simulation software company
 The Alaska-Alberta Railway Development Corporation (A2A Rail)